Herbie Nayokpuk (June 12, 1929 – December 2, 2006) (Iñupiaq pronunciation: Niiqpaq) nicknamed the "Shishmaref Cannonball", was an Inupiaq musher, known for his cheerful and straight-ahead demeanor It is said that "no musher in Iditarod history has been more admired, more respected or better liked than Herbie Nayokpuk."

Life and career
Nayokpuk was born in Shishmaref in 1929. He was one of the original mushers to run the Iditarod Trail Sled Dog Race in 1973.  He also represented Alaska at the presidential inauguration of Ronald Reagan in 1981. He ended up running the Iditarod 11 times. He never won, but he made some notably daring attempts in extreme weather conditions. He suffered a stroke after one race and competed in another despite having just recovered from a heart attack. He was also an accomplished Inupiaq artist.

Death and legacy
Nayokpuk died at the age of 77 at the Alaska Native Medical Center in Anchorage, Alaska after suffering a massive stroke at his home in mid-November and then lapsing into a coma. He is buried in Shishmaref. Each year since 2007, an Iditarod musher is awarded with the "Herbie Nayokpuk Memorial Award", which goes to the musher "who best epitomizes Herbie Nayokpuk's spirit of mushing the Iditarod"

References 

1929 births
2006 deaths
American dog mushers
Dog mushers from Alaska
Inupiat people
Inuit
Native American sportspeople
Inuit artists